The Mindoro bleeding-heart (Gallicolumba platenae), also referred to as kulo-kulo, la-do, manatad, manuk-manuk, punay, and puñalada by the Mangyan, is a species of ground dove native solely to the island of Mindoro in the Philippines. It is critically endangered and threatened by habitat loss largely motivated by marble extraction. Due to its biological line and its survival status, it has been listed as an EDGE species by the Zoological Society of London.

Because it is one of the rarest birds in the world and has an elusive nature, often hiding in the underbrush of forests, there is little known about its remaining populations.

Taxonomy and systematics 
This species is closely related to four other bleeding-heart dove species: G. luzonica, G. crinigera, G. keayi and G. menagei. These five species, along with G. rufigula, are grouped together into the genus Gallicolumba. A phylogenetic study in 2013 found strong evidence suggesting that the Philippine bleeding-hearts are monophyletic, or that they belong to the same taxonomic clade tied by a common ancestor.

The Mindoro bleeding-heart is monotypic, meaning it does not contain any smaller subspecies groups.

Its taxonomic standing, which dates back to author Salvadori in 1893, is deemed valid by the Integrated Taxonomic Information System.

Description 
This ground pigeon has been recorded to be around 26 to 30 cm tall. It has a dark grey forehead which transitions into an iridescent green on its head, nape, and hindneck. Its underside–from its throat to its flanks–is a cream-white except for the distinctive patch on the center of its breast which resembles a bright bleeding wound. The chest marking is less prominent and more orange in hue than that of related bleeding-heart doves. The dove's backside contains a reddish purple on its mantle, as well as chestnut coloration on its wings and rump. Its tail and uppertail-coverts are grey. Flecks of white triangles rest on its shoulders.

Its juvenile plumage is unknown.

Like other pigeons, Mindoro bleeding-hearts do not exhibit much sexual dimorphism. Females look similar to males but have purple irises and are generally smaller (141–154mm wingspan in females versus 150–154mm in males).

Distribution and habitat 
The Mindoro bleeding-heart dove is endemic to the island of Mindoro in the Philippines. It typically dwells in lowlands of 400m, but has been noted at 750–800m. It has only been observed in 4 regions of the island since 1980, as deforestation has dwindled its preferred habitat of closed-canopy primary forest. These regions are Puerto Galera, MUFRC Experimental Forest, Siburan, and Mt Iglit-Baco National Park, but scientists believe other populations may be scattered in other localities. This bird favors dry forest floors overrun with bamboos and rattans, occasionally dotted with limestone outcrops and boulders. It has also been observed near pools of dry riverbeds that exist on more leveled forest floors without as many rocks.

This dove is thought to be sedentary instead of migratory, but it is uncertain if it engages in altitudinal, seasonal or nomadic movements. It runs from danger and only flees from predators via brief flight when absolutely necessary.

Behavior and ecology

Vocalizations 

Few recordings of the Mindoro bleeding-heart's song exist, and some of those that do are not made publicly available because they threaten to exacerbate issues of trapping and endangerment. However, its call is believed to resemble a "croo croo" not unlike that of the Negros bleeding-heart.

Breeding 
It has been recorded breeding from February to May. Nests containing two cream-colored eggs have been found in late April and late June; the nests are made of sticks, leaves, and thin rootlets  resting on horizontal branches of shrubs or trees1.5–2m off the ground. According to one account, a female was seen feigning injury so as to distract from the nest she was incubating.

Food and feeding 
The dietary habits of the Mindoro bleeding-heart are not well-documented, but they are assumed to be similar to those of G. luzonica. It has been sighted feeding on fruiting figs alongside the genus Treron, or green pigeons.

Threats and Survival 
The IUCN Red List classifies it as Critically Endangered with an estimate of just 50–249 mature individuals and a declining population. The species' estimated extent of occurrence is 6800 km2. There are no individuals in captivity.

Its main threats are habitat loss and trapping. Extreme loss of forest has been caused by illegal logging, dynamite-blasting for marble, and slash-and-burn (also known as kaingin). In 1988, just 120 km2 of forest remained on Mindoro, only 25% of which was closed-canopy. Snares intended mainly for other animals such as Red junglefowl and other small mammals accidentally catch bleeding-hearts.

Conservation status 
A conservation study in 1991 found that the island of Mindoro is particularly susceptible to endemism, as it has the least forest cover of any Philippine island after the Sulu Islands. There are six bird species endemic to the island which can be categorized as montane and lowland; the Mindoro bleeding-heart is a lowland species which has been hunted with snares to meet demands for meat and pet trade.

Conservation actions proposed include to map the remaining forests on Mindoro, and survey these areas to clarify its current distribution and population status. It has also been recommended follow up on anecdotal reports of the species, establish captive breeding populations, conduct ecological studies to assess its requirements for breeding and foraging, and regulate hunting of wildlife species and the extraction of forest products within key habitats.

Various NGOs have been working to protect the Mindoro bleeding-heart and the other species in its genus. The Haribon Foundation has invested over 15 years in a project that seeks to integrate local communities via education and development; the organization has simultaneously teamed up with the Department of the Environment and Natural Resources (DENR) and local government initiatives to push for legislation that forbids deforestation. One method being used is "rainforestation", or the planting of native tree species which are easy to germinate, in contrast with typical reforestation efforts that introduce exotic species.

References

External links
Haribon Foundation: Mindoro bleeding-heart
BirdLife Species Factsheet: Mindoro bleeding-heart)
Gallicolumba platenae: Mindoro bleeding-heart
Philippine Bleeding-heart doves flutter at the brink, but NGOs respond

Mindoro bleeding-heart
Mindoro bleeding-heart
Endemic birds of the Philippines
Mindoro bleeding-heart
Mindoro bleeding-heart
Taxa named by Tommaso Salvadori